Yoojin Grace Wuertz (born 1980) is an American novelist who was reviewed for her 2017 book Everything Belongs To Us.

Born in Seoul, South Korea, Wuertz moved to the United States with her family at the age of six and was raised in the North Jersey communities of Paramus and Ridgefield Park. Wuertz earned a bachelor's degree in English from Yale University and earned a master's degree in fiction writing from New York University. Originally planning to pursue a career as an academic, she left a Ph.D. program at University of California, Berkeley and decided to devote her time to writing.

Wuertz has been a resident of Oradell.

References

1980 births
Living people
American writers of Korean descent
American women novelists
21st-century American novelists
New York University alumni
People from Oradell, New Jersey
People from Paramus, New Jersey
People from Ridgefield Park, New Jersey
People from Seoul
University of California, Berkeley alumni
Yale College alumni
21st-century American women writers